Martin Repiský (born 4 November 2000) is a Slovak football goalkeeper who currently plays for Slovan Galanta.

Career

Pohronie
Repiský began his senior career with Pohronie competing in the Slovak top division, after returning from a loan spell in the youth teams of Slovan Bratislava. He moved to replace departing Czech goalkeeper Matěj Luksch as a back-up goalkeeper to Tomáš Jenčo.

Repiský made his Fortuna Liga debut in the premier round of the 2020–21 season, in an away fixture at ViOn Aréna against ViOn Zlaté Moravce, being preferred over Jenčo due to his shoulder injury. Repiský had a bad start to the match, conceding two goals in three minutes from Martin Kovaľ and Tomáš Ďubek. Pohronie however moved to equalise the game in the second half through late goals by Alieu Fadera and a free-kick goal by James Weir.

Loan at Slavoj Trebišov
In the winter of 2021, Repiský was loaned out to 2. Liga club Slavoj Trebišov to gain more experience.

References

External links

Futbalnet profile 

2000 births
Living people
People from Žarnovica District
Sportspeople from the Banská Bystrica Region
Slovak footballers
Association football goalkeepers
FK Pohronie players
FK Slavoj Trebišov players
FC Slovan Galanta players
Slovak Super Liga players
2. Liga (Slovakia) players
3. Liga (Slovakia) players